The canton of Rezé-1 is an administrative division of the Loire-Atlantique department, western France. It was created at the French canton reorganisation which came into effect in March 2015. Its seat is in Rezé.

It consists of the following communes:
Rezé (partly)
Bouaye
Bouguenais
Brains
Saint-Aignan-Grandlieu
Saint-Léger-les-Vignes

References

Cantons of Loire-Atlantique